= Journal of Diabetes Investigation =

- Discipline: Endocrinology
- Language: English
- Edited by: Nigishi Hotta

Publication details
- History: 2010-present
- Publisher: John Wiley & Sons
- Frequency: Bimonthly
- Impact factor: 4.232 (2020)

Standard abbreviations
- ISO 4: J. Diabetes Investig.

Indexing
- CODEN: JDIOAY
- ISSN: 2040-1116 (print); 2040-1124 (web)
- LCCN: 2010208860
- OCLC no.: 754644885

Links
- Journal homepage; Online access; Online archive

The Journal of Diabetes Investigation is a bimonthly peer-reviewed medical journal covering the study of diabetes. It was established in 2010 and is published by John Wiley & Sons on behalf of the Asian Association for the Study of Diabetes, of which it is the official journal. The editor-in-chief is Nigishi Hotta (Chubu Rosai Hospital). In 2014, the journal became open-access. According to the Journal Citation Reports, the journal has a 2020 impact factor of 4.232.
